Sheastley Memorial Girls High School has popularly known as S.M.G. High School and established  in 1943, by Ms.Margret Stall which located in Gudur, Nellore district, Andhra Pradesh, India. Actually it was established in 1868, but was recognised by the government of India in the year 1943. Several people had education from this school who served as famous doctors, lawyers, engineers and teachers. Now it runs as an aided government school and is managed by S.A.L.C. (South Andhra Lutheran Church). The school had completed its centenary in 1968. So many people have the attachment from generations with this school. Few people say, that themselves, their parents, grandparents and grand grand parents also have studied in this school. It has a big playground, and once it had a nice garden at courtyard. But, now all the glory vanished and the school remain with lack of strength n faculty.

References

 https://plus.google.com/104408435702200384441/about?gl=in&hl=en

High schools and secondary schools in Andhra Pradesh
Schools in Nellore district
Girls' schools in Andhra Pradesh
1868 establishments in India
Educational institutions established in 1868